"The force that through the green fuse drives the flower" is a poem by Welsh poet Dylan Thomas— the poem that "made Thomas famous." Written in 1933 (when Thomas was nineteen), it was first published in his 1934 collection 18 Poems.

Like the other poems in 18 Poems, which belong to what has been called Thomas's "womb-tomb period", it deals with "creation, both physical and poetic, and the temporal process of birth, death, and rebirth".

Influence
The poem was the inspiration for a series of paintings by Ceri Richards made between 1943 and 1945. Some phrases ("starry dynamo" and "machinery of night") in Allen Ginsberg's 1955 poem "Howl" were derived from Thomas's poem. As well, its title served as the basis for the 1976 Roger Zelazny story "The Force That Through the Circuit Drives the Current."

References

External links
Text of the poem
"The Life and Work of Dylan Thomas"

Anglo-Welsh literature
1933 poems
Poetry by Dylan Thomas